Scolecenchelys fuscapenis is a species of eels in the family Ophichthidae (worm/snake eels). It was described by John E. McCosker, S. Ide, and Hiromitsu Endo in 2012.

References

Fish described in 2012
fuscapenis